Pogănești may refer to the following places:

Romania
 Pogănești, a village in Zam, Hunedoara Commune, Hunedoara County
 Pogănești, a village in Bârna Commune, Timiș County
 Pogănești, a village in Stănilești Commune, Vaslui County

Moldova
 Pogănești, a village in Hîncești District